Marcello Dell'Utri (born 11 September 1941) is a former Italian politician and senior advisor to Prime Minister Silvio Berlusconi. Formerly Senator in the Italian Senate. 
Dell'Utri has been found guilty of tax fraud, false accounting, and complicity in conspiracy with the Sicilian Mafia; the conviction for the last charge has been upheld on 9 May 2014 by the Italian Supreme Court of Cassation which sentenced Dell'Utri to seven years in prison. The conviction is final and cannot be further appealed. The third criminal section of Palermo's Appellate Court declared Dell'Utri a fugitive in May 2014, when it was discovered he had fled the country ahead of the final court decision. After being detained in Lebanon, on 13 June 2014 Dell'Utri was extradited to Italy, where he served 4 years of imprisonment and 1 year of house arrest. He has been further sentenced in April 2018 to 12 years due to the State-Mafia Pact.

Business and political activities
Dell'Utri was born in Palermo, Sicily. After school in his native city, he went to Milan to study law at university. After graduation, Dell'Utri went back to Palermo to work at the Cassa di Risparmio di Sicilia (Sicilian Savings Bank), but by 1973 he was back in Milan where he began work for Silvio Berlusconi's building firm Edilnord. Late in the 1970s, he went to work at Bresciano Costruzioni, but in 1980 he was called by Berlusconi and worked for Publitalia '80, the advertising sales wing of Fininvest's television division, first as a manager and later as the company's chairman and chief executive.

Founder of Forza Italia 
In 1994 he was one of the founders of Forza Italia, together with Silvio Berlusconi and Cesare Previti; Forza Italia was a big-tent centre-right party, with liberal conservative, Christian democratic and even social democratic factions, whose aim was to collect all the votes of the disbanded Pentapartito, the governing centrist coalition which was dissolved after Tangentopoli scandal.

In 1995 Dell'Utri left Publitalia '80, the advertising company owned by Berlusconi. In 1996 he was elected to the Italian Chamber of Deputies (lower house of the Italian Parliament); while in 1999 he was elected to the European Parliament, of which he stayed member until 2004.

In the 2001 general election he was elected as a senator in the Italian Senate, and was re-elected in 2006 and 2008.

Collusion with the Mafia

Vittorio Mangano 
In 1973, Dell'Utri introduced Vittorio Mangano, already charged for Mafia crimes, to Silvio Berlusconi, as a gardener and stable man at the Villa San Martino owned by Berlusconi in Arcore, a small town near Milan. Mangano's real job is alleged to have been to deter kidnappers from targeting the tycoon's children.

Salvatore Cancemi and Totò Riina 
In 1996, the Mafia pentito (justice collaborator) Salvatore Cancemi declared that Berlusconi and Dell'Utri were in direct contact with Mafia boss Totò Riina. The alleged contacts, according to Cancemi, were to lead to legislation favourable to Cosa Nostra, in particular the harsh 41-bis prison regime. The underlying premise was that Cosa Nostra would support Berlusconi's Forza Italia party in return for political favours. After a two-year investigation, magistrates closed the inquiry without charges. They did not find evidence to corroborate Cancemi's allegations. Similarly, a two-year investigation, also launched on evidence from Cancemi, into Berlusconi's alleged association with the Mafia was closed in 1996. Cancemi disclosed that Fininvest, through Marcello Dell'Utri and mafioso Vittorio Mangano, had paid Cosa Nostra 200 million lire (100 000 euro) annually.

Antonino Giuffre' and Bernardo Provenzano 

According to yet another mafia justice collaborator, Antonino Giuffrè –  arrested on 16 April 2002 – the Mafia turned to Berlusconi's Forza Italia party to look after the Mafia's interests, after the decline in the early 1990s of the ruling Christian Democrat party (DC – Democrazia Cristiana) – whose leaders in Sicily looked after the Mafia's interests in Rome. The Mafia's fall out with the Christian Democrats became clear when the DC strong man in Sicily, Salvo Lima, was killed in March 1992. "The Lima murder marked the end of an era," Giuffrè told the court. "A new era opened with a new political force on the horizon which provided the guarantees that the Christian Democrats were no longer able to deliver. To be clear, that party was Forza Italia." If true, the allegations might explain the Berlusconi coalition's clean sweep of Sicily's 61 Parliament seats in the 2001 elections.

Dell'Utri was the go-between on a range of legislative efforts to ease pressure on mafiosi in exchange for electoral support, according to Giuffrè. "Dell'Utri was very close to Cosa Nostra and a very good contact point for Berlusconi," he said. Mafia boss Bernardo Provenzano told Giuffrè that they "were in good hands" with Dell'Utri, who was a "serious and trustworthy person". Dell'Utri's lawyer, Enrico Trantino, dismissed Giuffrè's allegations as an "anthology of hearsay". He said Giuffrè had perpetuated the trend that every new turncoat would attack Dell'Utri and the former Christian Democrat prime minister Giulio Andreotti in order to earn money and judicial privileges.

First Degree Conviction for Mafia Collusion (2004) 
In December 2004, he was convicted in first instance for complicity in conspiracy with the Mafia.() and sentenced to 9 years in 2004. Dell'Utri provided "a concrete, voluntary, conscious, specific and precious contribution to the illicit goals of Cosa Nostra, both economically and politically", according to the motivation of the sentence. The judges describe him as a bridge enabling Cosa Nostra "to come in contact with important economic and financial circles." Dell'Utri described the judges' deposition as "an uncritical endorsement of the arguments of the prosecution ... 1,800 uselessly repetitive pages." The appeals trial began in 2006.

Conviction in Appeal (2012) 
The Appellate Court of Palermo sentences Dell'Utri to seven years of detention for collusion with the Mafia, up to year 1992 having been acting as a liaison among mafia bosses Stefano Bontade, Toto' Riina, Bernardo Provenzano and being an intermediary between the criminal organizations in Sicily and Silvio Berlusconi. One of the incriminating circumstances being the employment of the mafia boss Vittorio Mangano under the disguise of a stable keeper at Berlusconi's villa in Arcore. The appellate court has ascertained that Marcello Dell'utri was an intermediary and advisor to Stefano Bontade up to the year 1980 and later up to year 1992 to Toto Riina and Bernardo Provenzano for direct investments in Milan, Lombardy and northern Italy aimed at laundering illicit profits coming from mafia criminal activities and drug trafficking by means of financial operations in companies based in northern Italy.

Supreme Court Final Conviction (2014) 
The Italian Supreme Court definitively sentenced Marcello Dell'Utri to seven years in prison. The third criminal section of Palermo Appellate Court declared Dell'Utri a fugitive when it was discovered he had left the country shortly ahead of the impending final Supreme Court decision. At the moment the sentence was read in Italy Dell'Utri was already being detained in Lebanon being swiftly captured in Beirut in a joint police operation led by Interpol and Lebanese police forces.
Investigators tracked him down to a luxury hotel in Beirut, where he was arrested by police. The Supreme Court convicted Dell'Utri of acting as a go-between for the Sicilian Mafia and the Milan business elite, including Berlusconi's companies, from 1974 to 1992.

Escape Attempt and arrest 

On 11 April 2014, the 3rd Criminal Section of the Appellate Court of Palermo, Sicily, issued an arrest warrant for Marcello Dell'Utri at the request of the national anti-mafia investigation department, which said it had obtained information that he might flee ahead of his hearing at Italy's highest court of appeal in Rome on 15 April.

Captured in Lebanon (2014) 

Following the issue of a European Arrest Warrant and an international Red Notice by Interpol, Dell'Utri was located and arrested in Beirut, Lebanon in a joint operation involving Lebanese intelligence and the Italian anti-mafia investigation department. Dell'Utri was traced down to the five-star Hotel Phoenicia through the use of his credit card and mobile phone records. Dell'Utri was alone at the moment of his arrest and was found in possession of a large amount of cash.

Extradition Procedure 

The procedure to extradite the detained Marcello Dell'utri from Lebanon to Italy had been initiated by the Italian justice ministry to the Lebanese authorities following his arrest in Lebanon on 12 April 2014. Dell'Utri remained detained in custody by Lebanese authorities till the completion of the extradition procedure. The Lebanese State Prosecution office has been, throughout the entire procedure, in contact with the Italian authorities over the issue via the official diplomatic channels and the Interpol offices in Beirut. On 13 June 2014, Dell'Utri was extradited to Italy and booked into the Parma Criminal Penitentiary where he is serving his seven years prison term. On 8 May 2016, his request for transfer to a prison in Rebibbia, Rome was accepted.

Other legal issues 

In 1999, the Corte di Cassazione (the highest judicial court in Italy) had already sentenced him to 2 years and 3 months for tax fraud and false accounting. Despite this, during the same year, he was elected as an MEP, and in 2001 he was appointed to the Italian Senate. Indeed, the Italian legal system allows the statute of limitations to continue to run during the course of legal trial. Thus, nullifying the fact of the pending charge.

His case became even more complicated when a transcript of a tapped phone conversation became public in April 2006. The conversation was between the fugitive Vito Roberto Palazzolo – a notorious Mafia "banker" linked to Bernardo Provenzano – and his sister in Milan. Palazzolo, convicted in Switzerland for laundering drug money, absconded to South Africa in 1986. Italy was seeking his extradition from South Africa. In the tapped phone conversation Palazzolo urged his sister to pressure Dell'Utri to disrupt the extradition attempts and offered to cut him in on construction deals in Angola. "Don't worry, you don't have to convert him, he's already been converted," Palazzolo said, implying that Dell'Utri was a link to the Mafia.

On 15 May 2007, the Appeal Court in Milan sentenced Dell'Utri and Mafia boss Vincenzo Virga to two years each for attempted extortion of Trapani Basket Ball team by Publitalia, the Fininvest concessionaire. Four years later, the Appeal Court in Milan nullified the sentence and absolved Dell'Utri and Virga because there is no substance to the fact.

He also claimed in 2007 to have located a number of lost diaries, purportedly written by Mussolini; these were later discovered to be forgeries.

Appeal

In October 2009, Gaspare Spatuzza, a Mafioso turned pentito in 2008, confirmed Giuffrè statements. Spatuzza testified that his boss Giuseppe Graviano had told him in 1994 that future prime minister Silvio Berlusconi was bargaining with the Mafia, concerning a political-electoral agreement between Cosa Nostra and Berlusconi's party Forza Italia. Spatuzza said Graviano disclosed the information to him during a conversation in a bar Graviano owned in the upscale Via Veneto district of the Italian capital Rome. Dell'Utri was the intermediary, according to Spatuzza. Dell'Utri has dismissed Spatuzza's allegations as "nonsense".

Spatuzza's allegations were included in the prosecution of Dell'Utri's Mafia collusion appeal and Spatuzza repeated his allegations at the Appeal Trial. Prosecutors argued that the Mafia spread panic with a campaign of terrorist bombings in mainland Italy in 1993 so that Forza Italia could step onto the political stage in the guise of national saviour. The bombings stopped after Berlusconi first won power in 1994.

On 29 June 2010, the Palermo Court of Appeals reduced the 2004 nine-year sentence for collusion with the Mafia to seven years. In reviewing the previous sentence, the appeals court said the conviction stood for acts committed by Dell'Utri prior to 1992, while he was acquitted for charges after that year. The prosecution had asked that the sentence be increased to 11 years. The judges took six days to consider their decision, an extraordinary long time for deliberations.

Further indictment for "mafia dealings" that took place in the 1990s 

On 31 October 2017, Dell'Utri is also officially enrolled in the register of people involved in underground negotiations between corrupted representatives of the Italian government and the mafia organizations in sicily (lit. State-Mafia Pact, "trattativa stato mafia") upon request of the Public Prosecutor, having the prosecutor's office obtained new relevant informations coming from the transcripts of telephone conversation in Palermo by the mafia boss Giuseppe Graviano involving Dell'Utri together with other people implicated in the negotiations. On 20 April 2018, he was sentenced to a further 12 years in prison.

Statements related to the mafia boss Vittorio Mangano 

After the Appeals court ruling, Dell'Utri expressed his admiration for the late Vittorio Mangano, a convicted Mafioso who up to his death in prison denied that any link existed between Cosa Nostra and Dell'Utri and Berlusconi. "He was a sick inmate who was asked to testify against me and Berlusconi and always refused to do so. If he had, anything he would have said would have been believed. But he preferred to stay in prison, and die there, rather than to make unjust accusations," Dell'Utri said. "He was my hero. I don't know if I could have resisted as much as he did."

Biblioteca di Via Senato and other associations 
Dell'Utri has been also the founder of Biblioteca di via Senato, l'Erasmo. Trimestrale della civiltà europea, Il Domenicale. He is also president of the cultural association Il Circolo Giovani.

See also

References

External links

 Official Site
 Official Italian Senate Site
 Forza Italia party Site
 Sentenza Dell’Utri The verdict for complicity in conspiracy with the Mafia
 Fininvest

1941 births
Living people
Forza Italia MEPs
Italian people convicted of tax crimes
Italian politicians convicted of crimes
Members of the Chamber of Deputies (Italy)
Members of the Senate of the Republic (Italy)
MEPs for Italy 1999–2004
Politicians from Palermo
Politicians convicted of fraud
Criminals from Sicily